Nicholas Lens Noorenbergh (born 1957) is a Belgian composer of contemporary music, particularly known for his operas. His work is published by Schott Music and Mute Song  and distributed by Universal Music Group and  Sony BMG. In 2020 Nicholas Lens signed with Deutsche Grammophon.

Lens lives alternately in Brussels and Venice. He has one daughter, the Berlin-based painter Clara-Lane Lens

Works

Operas
 L.I.T.A.N.I.E.S, trance-minimal chamber opera with libretto by Nick Cave, written and produced by Nicholas Lens & Nick Cave, release by Deutsche Grammophon
 Shell Shock, opera with libretto by Nick Cave, world premiere on 24 October 2014 at the Royal Opera House La Monnaie
 Slow Man, opera with libretto by John M. Coetzee based on his novel Slow Man, world premiere on 5 July 2012 at the Malta Festival, Grand Theatre, Poznań

Vocal and chamber music
 The Puppet Designer (Der Bashafer fun Marionetn) for baritone and chamber orchestra, live performance at Unesco (The Power of Culture, Festival June 18, 1996), published by Schott Music 2006 
 Wired, theatrical chamber music for harp and soprano, premiered at Beijing, China on 5 December 2006.
 The trilogy The Accacha Chronicles (2005), for soprano, tenor, countertenor, mezzo-soprano, baritone, bass, male actor, small choir, mixed choir and chamber orchestra, Sony BMG 82876 66239 2, published by Schott Music
 Flamma Flamma – The Fire Requiem (1994),  Sony Classical SK 66293 <ref>Time Magazine (1995). "MEMENTO MORI". 'Time Inc, 1995', Retrieved on 23 February 2007.</ref>
 Terra Terra – The Aquarius Era (1999), BMG Classics 74321 697182
 Amor Aeternus – Hymns of Love (2005), Sony BMG 82876 66238 2
 Orrori dell'Amore (1995) for soprano, baritone, counter tenor and chamber orchestra, CD release on Sony Classical (SK 62016), published by Schott Music.

Study books
 100 Etudes, Exercises and Simple Tonal Phrases for Piano (Volume I and volume II), published by Schott Music.
 Venticinque Movimenti per Contrabbasso solo (25 Movements for solo double bass), published by Schott Music.

Films and film scores
 The film (22 min.) Love Is the Only Master I'll Serve, premiered at the Brooklyn International Film Festival New York, June 2006
 The soundtrack of Mein erstes Wunder'', a film by Anne Wild, world premiere at Berlin International Film Festival, 2003 
 The soundtrack of ‘’Marie Antoinette is niet dood’’, a film by Irma Achten, world premiere at Rotterdam International Film Festival, 1996

References

External links
 
 Nicholas Lens : Publisher Schott Music International Mainz
 Publisher Mute Song London: 
 
 Review of Flamma Flamma (The Fire Requiem)
  
 
 
 

Belgian opera composers
Male opera composers
Musicians from Ypres
20th-century classical composers
21st-century classical composers
Belgian classical composers
Belgian male classical composers
Belgian film score composers
Male film score composers
Flemish composers
1957 births
Postmodern artists
Musicians from Brussels
Living people
Postmodern composers
Musicians from Venice
20th-century Italian male musicians
21st-century Italian male musicians